Mauro Rafael da Costa Antunes (born 10 January 1992) is a Portuguese footballer who plays for Belenenses as a midfielder.

Football career
On 29 July 2012, Antunes made his professional debut with Atlético in a 2012–13 Taça da Liga match against Naval

References

External links
 
Stats and profile at LPFP 

1992 births
Sportspeople from Setúbal
Living people
Portuguese footballers
Association football midfielders
Liga Portugal 2 players
Campeonato de Portugal (league) players
Atlético Clube de Portugal players
Académico de Viseu F.C. players
C.D.R. Quarteirense players
Anadia F.C. players
C.D. Mafra players
Amora F.C. players
Portugal youth international footballers